Bethuadahari College, established in 1986, is a general degree college in Nakashipara of Nadia district, West Bengal. It offers undergraduate courses in arts and commerce. Currently, it is affiliated to University of Kalyani.

History 
This college was established on 6 October 1986. Initially it was affiliated to the University of Calcutta but In 1999, it is affiliated to the University of Kalyani. The local enlightened persons, poor villagers, farmers, landless agricultural labours, vendors, hawkers, rickshaw pullers, even porters also contributed a lot to set up the college either by means of giving or extending financial help or offering manual labour. Even the local unemployed youth offered their labour voluntarily for construction work of the college. Initially Bethuadahari college started its journey with commerce stream only. Thereafter, other subjects like History, Bengali, Political Science, Sociology, Philosophy, and English in B.A. Course were introduced.

Departments

Arts and Commerce
Bengali
English
Geography
History
Commerce

Accreditation
The college is recognized by the University Grants Commission (UGC).

See also

References

External links
Bethuadahari College
University of Kalyani
University Grants Commission
National Assessment and Accreditation Council

Colleges affiliated to University of Kalyani
Educational institutions established in 1986
Universities and colleges in Nadia district
1986 establishments in West Bengal